The Catholic Medical Association (CMA) is an organization of Catholic physicians, dentists, and health care professionals in the United States and Canada.  it had about 900 members. Until 1997, it was known as the National Federation of Catholic Physicians Guilds.

Description

The organization studies and holds conferences on topics that relate spirituality and health. For instance, the theme of the 74th annual meeting in 2005 was "The Biological and Spiritual Development of the Child", and was attended by physicians from 43 US states and Canada, as well as a number of theologians. Another example of the interleaving of religion and medicine that permeates the organization was the 2008 White Mass for healthcare professionals, held on the feast of Saint Luke, the patron saint of physicians.

The organization started around 1932 as local guilds of physicians meeting in various dioceses and then became the International Federation of Catholic Medical Associations, based in Rome. It eventually became the Catholic Medical Association. It publishes a journal of medical ethics, The Linacre Quarterly.

The organization continues to comment on current policies of the United States Department of Health and Human Services. The organization opposes euthanasia. The use of human cloning experiments is also opposed by the organization. The organization is a supporter of the "Rules of Conscience" in medical practice. It takes the position that homosexuality is not "inborn" and is a condition that is both preventable and treatable. The Catholic Medical Association also sponsors specific studies, for example, on the prevention of sexual abuse of children.

The organization has affiliates in various parts of the United States and is recognized and its policies are supported by the US Conference of Catholic Bishops On some legal and ethical issues, the organization cooperates with other Christian organizations such as the Christian Medical Association.

The Catholic Medical Students Association is an association of medical students in the United States, operating in conjunction with the Catholic Medical Association and has some regional branches.

See also
 Christian Medical and Dental Associations

References

External links
 

Anti-abortion organizations in Canada
Anti-abortion organizations in the United States
Catholic Church in Canada
Catholic Church in the United States
Catholic lay organisations
Medical and health organizations based in Pennsylvania
Medical associations based in the United States
Organizations established in 1932